Structural estimation is a technique for estimating deep "structural" parameters of theoretical economic models. The term is inherited from the simultaneous equations model. In this sense "structural estimation" is contrasted with "reduced-form estimation", which is the statistical relationship between observed variables.

The difference between a structural parameter and a reduced-form parameter was formalized in the work of the Cowles Foundation. A structural parameter is also said to be "policy invariant" whereas the value of reduced-form parameter can depend on exogenously determined parameters set by public policy makers. The distinction between structural and reduced-form estimation within "microeconometrics" is related to the Lucas critique of reduced-form macroeconomic policy predictions.

The original distinction between structure and reduced-form was between the underlying system and the direct relationship between observables implied by the system. Different combinations of structural parameters can imply the same reduced-form parameters, so structural estimation must go beyond the direct relationship between variables.

Many economists now use the term "reduced form" to mean statistical estimation without reference to a specific economic model. For example, a regression is often called a reduced-form equation even when no standard economic model would generate it as the reduced form relationship between variables.

These conflicting distinctions between structural and reduced form estimation arose from the increasing complexity of economic theory since the formalization of simultaneous equations estimation. A structural model often involves sequential decision-making under uncertainty or strategic environments where beliefs about other agents' actions matter. Parameters of such models are estimated not with regression analysis but non-linear techniques such as generalized method of moments, maximum likelihood, and indirect inference. The reduced-form of such models may result in a regression relationship but often only for special or trivial cases of the structural parameters.

See also 

 Methodology of econometrics

Notes

References 

 
 

 
 

Estimation methods

Economic methodology

Econometrics